Reason and Emotion is a 1943 propaganda short film by Walt Disney Productions, which was nominated for the Academy Award for Best Animated Short Film in 1943. Released on August 27, 1943 in the United States, the short is eight minutes long.

The short has been compared to the 2015 Pixar Animation Studios film Inside Out.

Plot
The short demonstrates how a person adopts their ability to solve problems through logical reasoning (the head) or through emotional passion (the heart). Adolf Hitler is shown to not have any reasoning, instead relying purely on emotion; it is explained that "Americans should control the emotion inside our head lest it control us — and make us vulnerable to Hitler's vile fearmongering." Hitler's speeches and motivational tactics are shown as manipulative.

Production
Reason and Emotion was directed by Bill Roberts, with animation by Ward Kimball and Ollie Johnston, among others. BlogofDeath explains: "During World War II, [Joe] Grant and animator Dick Huemer created gags and designs for many of Disney’s patriotic-themed cartoons", including this movie.

Home media
The short was released on May 18, 2004 on Walt Disney Treasures: Walt Disney on the Front Lines.

Critical reception
IndieWire wrote, "Reason and Emotion is exactly the kind of thing that sticks in your mind because it is strange, a wartime film that used a visual metaphor to make a case about Americans keeping their calm during WWII."

References

External sources

 Openculture.com
 Ptsnob.com
 Academia.edu
 Patriotoutreach.org
 Lybio.net
 D23.com
 Manic-expression.com
 Thefw.com
 

American World War II propaganda shorts
1940s educational films
1943 films
1943 animated films
1940s Disney animated short films
Disney educational films
Films directed by Bill Roberts
Films produced by Walt Disney